The Brave Engineer is a 1950 Walt Disney-produced animated short film, based on the exploits of legendary railroad engineer John Luther "Casey" Jones. It is narrated by comic Jerry Colonna and is a comedically madcap fanciful re-telling of the story related in the Wallace Saunders ballad, later made famous by Eddie Newton and T. Lawrence Seibert. It was also released fifty years after Jones was killed.

This short has appeared on many television programs and specials such as Walt Disney's Wonderful World of Color (1954), The Mouse Factory (1972), Good Morning, Mickey! (1983), Walt Disney Cartoon Classics (1983), DTV (1984), American Folk Heroes (1985), Disney's Sing Along Songs (1986), Disney's Rootin' Tootin' Roundup (1990), Mickey's Mouse Tracks (1992), Donald's Quack Attack (1992), Sing Me a Story with Belle (1995), The Ink and Paint Club (1997), Walt Disney Treasures (2001), and Disney's American Legends (2001).

Plot
The cartoon opens to a railroad yard where "all the trains are fast asleep." The sun rises, and engineer Casey Jones wakes from his slumber in the cab of his engine, Johnny, No. 2, an American Standard 4-4-0 tender engine that is hauling a train consisting of a mail car and the No. 53 four wheel caboose known as the Western Mail. His train begins the journey, and Casey is intent on making his schedule at all costs. The Western Mail is repeatedly delayed along the journey.

Casey is confronted by a variety of obstacles along the way. He has to paddle his train through flooded wetlands, stop for a cow crossing the tracks, and save a woman who was tied up on the tracks by a stereotypical villain character. Another villain destroys a span of tracks on a trestle, and as Casey has to get the Western Mail across a gorge without those tracks, his train heads on into a dry desert cannon. He fights off a group of criminals, who climb onto the cab of Johnny in an attempt to rob the train.

To make up for lost time, Casey runs Johnny well past his mechanical limits, plowing through two tunnels (One which exploded & the last one didn't), passing a five mile sign causing it & the tracks to melt. While focusing completely on repairing Johnny, he drives the Western Mail at full speed down a hill on a collision course with another train, which is a double-headed slow freight train with Zeb and Zeek, No. 77 and No. 75, two American Mastodon 4-8-0 tender engines, who are pulling it. The conductor sees the other train, runs up, and attempts to warn Casey about the oncoming train, but fails to get the message, and jumps off the train when Casey doesn't notice it until it is too late, causing the two trains to collide with a large explosion, only for the conductor on his train to be seen in the next shot of a goof. The conductor and other railroad employees like the freight train drivers and firemen are able to jump clear of the collision and explosion. The Western Mail is almost completely destroyed, but much to the porter's disappointment of thinking being late, he sees Casey arrive at his destination, with the remains of Johnny, almost on time.

Differences between the cartoon and real life
The shorts depicts the accident as a head-on collision in an Ozark-like mountain range near Reno, Wyoming. In real life, Jones' engine struck the back of a train that had stopped  near Vaughan due to a broken air line.
The accident takes place in broad daylight and clear conditions in the short. The real accident occurred at night during a rainstorm.
The short ends with Casey looking mildly injured after the wreck, but very much alive. In real life, Jones was critically injured and did not survive the accident.
Casey operates Johnny No. 2 single-handedly in the short. In real life, Jones was assisted by Sim Webb. 
Johnny is an American Standard 4-4-0 tender engine No. 2 taking the Western Mail in the short, (Possibly resembling Central pacific #173). Jones' real engine was an American 4-6-0 engine No. 382 nicknamed "Ole 382" and "Cannonball" since No. 99, an American 4-6-0 tender engine, is doiled up as a replica of that engine, which was originally scrapped in 1935.
Zeb and Zeek No. 77 and No. 75 are two American Mastodon 4-8-0 tender engines in the cartoon on the other train.
The railroad that Casey & his engine Johnny ran through Fort Reno to Frisco may had possibly The First transcontinental railroad not the Illinois Central Railroad like their real life counterparts worked on.
Casey Jones' train (Which consists of Johnny/No. 2, the mail car & caboose #53) has reappeared in Out of Scale and A Cowboy Needs a Horse.

Home media
The short was released on December 6, 2005 on Walt Disney Treasures: Disney Rarities - Celebrated Shorts: 1920s–1960s.

Additional releases include:
2001 Disney's American Legends

See also

Make Mine Music - The 1946 package feature that featured "Casey at the Bat" which similar design and madcap comedic pace
John Luther "Casey" Jones
Casey Jones - Also a loose adaptation of the legend with Alan Hale as Casey

References

External links
 The Brave Engineer @ Big Cartoon Database
 
 Walt Disney's Story Of The Brave Engineer (Casey Jones) RCA Victor Records (Audiobook) on Internet Archive and YouTube
 D23 entry

1950 short films
1950 animated films
1950s Disney animated short films
American folklore films and television series
Films directed by Jack Kinney
Films produced by Walt Disney
Films scored by Ken Darby
Cultural depictions of Casey Jones
Animated films about trains
1950s English-language films
American animated short films
RKO Pictures short films
RKO Pictures animated short films